Orłów  is a village in the administrative district of Gmina Borowa, within Mielec County, Subcarpathian Voivodeship, in south-eastern Poland. It was established in the 1780s a Galician German settlement and originally known as Schönanger.

References

Villages in Mielec County